Antonio Maffei or Antonius de Maffeis (died 1482) was a Roman Catholic prelate who served as Bishop of Montepeloso from 1479 until his death.

Biography
On 25 June 1479, Antonio Maffei was appointed Bishop of Montepeloso during the papacy of Pope Sixtus IV. He held that position until his death in 1482.

References

External links and additional sources
 (Chronology of Bishops) 
 (Chronology of Bishops) 

15th-century Italian Roman Catholic bishops
Bishops appointed by Pope Sixtus IV
1482 deaths